Saint Orontius may refer to:

Orontius of Lecce (Oronzo)
See Vincent, Orontius, and Victor for St Orontius, martyr